Kimanis (Chinese: 金馬利) is a town and also a parliamentary constituency in Papar District, West Coast Division of Sabah, Malaysia. It is located approximately 45 kilometres south of the city of Kota Kinabalu, halfway between Papar and Beaufort.

History
Kimanis used to be the base for the American Trading Company of Borneo owned by Joseph William Torrey, Thomas Bradley Harris and Chinese investors, which obtained a lease over part of northern Borneo area from the Sultanate of Brunei in the late 19th century. The area was then taken over by the British under the administration of North Borneo. The British built a railway track; the Kimanis railway station became one of the stops on the present-day Sabah State Railway.

In 2006, there was a proposal to relocate the current Kota Kinabalu International Airport to Kimanis. However the government decided it was economically more feasible to renovate and extend the present airport. The national oil and gas company, Petronas construct a terminal there known as Sabah Oil and Gas Terminal (SOGT) that was completed in 2014, mainly to process and transport oil and gas from the West Coast Field in South China Sea; the terminal is also connected with another oil and gas terminal in neighbouring Sarawak through the Sabah–Sarawak Gas Pipeline (SSGP).

Local government
Kimanis is within the municipal area of the Papar District Council (Majlis Daerah Papar).

References 

Papar District
Populated places in Sabah